"Lookin' for That Girl" is a song recorded by American country music artist Tim McGraw. It was released in January 2014 as the first single from his second studio album for Big Machine Records, Sundown Heaven Town. The single was still rising the charts when Big Machine Records pulled it so that McGraw's next single, "Meanwhile Back at Mama's", could be released.

History
Co-writer James T. Slater told Roughstock that the idea came when writing with Mark Irwin, who suggested that the two write with Chris Tompkins. Slater said that he had an idea that "wasn't really fitting anything" when Tompkins played a loop on a drum machine and came up with the song's title.

Two mixes of the song exist: the original mix and an "A.M. Radio" remix, which reduces the heavy Auto-Tune used throughout the song.

Critical reception
Giving it a "C", Joseph Hudak of Country Weekly said that "sonically, it recalls slow-rolling '90s Southern rap" but that "it's jarring in nearly every other way." He criticized the "electronic framework" and the lack of a country sound, as well as McGraw's "clipped" performance, and said that the lyrics were "slapdash, and if we're honest, a little too youthful for one of country's elder statesmen." Matt Bjorke of Roughstock gave the original mix of the song 2.5 stars out of 5, criticizing the use of Auto-Tune on the chorus but saying that the song was "likeable enough"; he gave the "A.M. Radio" remix 3 out of 5 stars.

In an editorial for The Boot, Sterling Whitaker observed that many fans on Twitter and Taste of Country have criticized the song for its hip hop-styled production and Auto-Tune.

Music video
The music video was directed by Sophie Muller and premiered on March 14, 2014.

Chart performance
The song entered the Country Airplay chart at No. 46 for chart dated February 1, 2014, and No. 10 on the Country Digital Songs two weeks later at No. 10.  It spent 7 weeks on the Billboard's Bubbling Under Hot 100 chart before debuting on Billboard Hot 100 at No. 96 for chart dated April 5, 2014.
The song has sold 217,000 copies in the U.S. as of April 2014.

Year-end charts

References

2014 singles
Tim McGraw songs
Songs written by Chris Tompkins
Songs written by Mark Irwin (songwriter)
Songs written by James T. Slater
Song recordings produced by Byron Gallimore
Song recordings produced by Tim McGraw
Big Machine Records singles
2014 songs
Music videos directed by Sophie Muller